Ohio elected its members October 8, 1816.

See also 
 1816 Ohio's 1st congressional district special election
 1816 and 1817 United States House of Representatives elections
 List of United States representatives from Ohio

Notes

References 

1816
Ohio
United States House of Representatives